John Goodenow may refer to:
 John M. Goodenow (1782–1838), U.S. Representative from Ohio
 John H. Goodenow (1833–1906), American politician from Maine

See also
 John Goodnow (1858–1907), businessman and American diplomat